The Iranian-made Fajr-3  is believed to be a medium-range ballistic missile with an unknown range (estimated 2,000 km, 1,250 miles).

The Islamic Revolutionary Guard Corps unveiled the missile during the Holy Prophet wargames on March 31, 2006. Islamic Revolutionary Guard Corps Aerospace Force commander Brigade general Hossein Salami announced on television "the successful test-firing of a new missile with greater technical and tactical capabilities than those previously produced". He did not specify the missile's range, which can vary with the payload.

Operators
 Iran

See also
 Military of Iran
 Aerospace Force of the Islamic Revolutionary Guard Corps
 Iranian military industry
 Equipment of the Iranian Army

References

External links
 
 
 

Medium-range ballistic missiles of Iran
Surface-to-surface missiles of Iran
Theatre ballistic missiles
Military equipment introduced in the 2000s